School Life may refer to:

School Life (2019 film), a French teen comedy drama film 
School Life (2016 film), an Irish documentary film